High Seas may refer to:

 International waters
 High Seas (TV series), 2019 Spanish Netflix original
 High Seas (film), 1929 British film
 High Seas (album), 2001 album by Trailer Bride
 "High Seas" (NCIS), episode of American television series NCIS season 1

See also
 HI-SEAS, the Hawaii Space Exploration Analog and Simulation habitat